José Ortega may refer to:

 José Ortega y Gasset (1883–1955), Spanish Conservative philosopher
 José Ortega Spottorno (1916–2002), Spanish journalist and publisher
 José Ortega Cano (born 1953), Spanish bullfighter
 José Ortega Torres (born 1943), poet
 José Ortega (boxer) (born 1963), Spanish Olympic boxer
 José Francisco Ortega (1734–1798), Spanish soldier and explorer with the 1769 Portola expedition
 José Ortega (baseball) (born 1988), Venezuelan baseball pitcher
 José Benito Ortega (1858–1941), American sculptor